Events from the year 1995 in the United States.

Incumbents

Federal government 
 President: Bill Clinton (D-Arkansas)
 Vice President: Al Gore (D-Tennessee)
 Chief Justice: William Rehnquist (Wisconsin) 
 Speaker of the House of Representatives: Tom Foley (D-Washington) (until January 3), Newt Gingrich  (R-Georgia) (starting January 4)
 Senate Majority Leader: George J. Mitchell (D-Maine) (until January 3), Bob Dole (R-Kansas) (starting January 3)
 Congress: 103rd (until January 3), 104th (starting January 3)

Events

January
 January 1 – The History Channel is launched.
 January 4 – The 104th United States Congress, the first controlled by Republicans in both houses since 1953 to 1955, convenes.
 January 11 – Robert Rubin is sworn in as the new Secretary of Treasury, succeeding Lloyd Bentsen.
 January 24 – State of the Union Address.
 January 26 – The House of Representatives passes a balanced budget amendment to the US Constitution by a vote of 300-132.
 January 29 – Super Bowl XXIX: The San Francisco 49ers become the first National Football League franchise to win five Super Bowls, as they defeat the San Diego Chargers at Joe Robbie Stadium in Miami, Florida.
 January 31 – U.S. President Bill Clinton invokes emergency powers to extend a $20 billion loan to help Mexico avert financial collapse.

February
 February 9 – STS-63: Dr. Bernard A. Harris Jr. and Michael Foale become the first African American and Briton, respectively, to walk in space.
 February 15 – Hacker Kevin Mitnick is arrested by the FBI and charged with breaking into some of the United States' most secure computer systems.
 February 17 – Colin Ferguson is convicted of six counts of murder for the December 1993 Long Island Rail Road shooting and later receives a 200+ year sentence.
 February 18 – Private Tracie McBride is kidnapped, raped and murdered in Texas by former soldier Louis Jones Jr.
 February 23 – The Dow Jones Industrial Average gains 30.28 to close at 4,003.33 – the Dow's first ever close above 4,000.
 February 27 – In Denver, Colorado, Stapleton Airport closes and is replaced by the new Denver International Airport, the largest in the United States.
 February 28 – Members of the group Patriot's Council are convicted in Minnesota under the Biological Weapons Anti-Terrorism Act of 1989 for manufacturing ricin.

March
 March 2 
 Yahoo! is incorporated.
 An amendment to the Constitution on a Balanced Budget is voted down by one vote in the US Senate. The deciding vote was cast by Oregon Republican senator Mark Hatfield.
 March 13 – David Daliberti and William Barloon, two Americans working for a military contractor in Kuwait, are arrested after straying into Iraq.
 March 14 – Astronaut Norman Thagard becomes the first American to ride into space aboard a Russian launch vehicle (the Soyuz TM-21), lifting off from the Baikonur Cosmodrome in Kazakhstan.
 March 16 – Mississippi ratifies the Thirteenth Amendment, becoming the last state to approve the abolition of slavery. The amendment was nationally ratified in 1865, but did not make it official until 2013.
 March 27 – The 67th Academy Awards, hosted by David Letterman, are held at Shrine Auditorium in Los Angeles, with Robert Zemeckis' Forrest Gump winning six awards out of 13 nominations, including Best Picture and Best Director. The telecast garners nearly 48.3 million viewers, making it the most-watched Oscars broadcast since 1983.
 March 26: Rapper Eric Lynn Wright, better known as Eazy-E, dies of complications from AIDS
 March 31 – Singer-songwriter Selena Quintanilla-Pérez (known simply as Selena) is murdered in Corpus Christi, Texas by the president of her fan club, Yolanda Saldívar.

April

 April 5 – The U.S. House of Representatives votes 246–188 to cut taxes for individuals and corporations.
 April 7 – House Republicans celebrate passage of most of the Contract with America.
 April 19 – Oklahoma City bombing: 168 people, including eight Federal Marshals and 19 children, are killed at the Alfred P. Murrah Federal Building. Timothy McVeigh and one of his accomplices, Terry Nichols, set off the bomb.
 April 23 – President Clinton visits Oklahoma City and gives an address, stating "Today our nation is joined with you in grief."
 April 24 – A Unabomber bomb kills lobbyist Gilbert Murray in Sacramento, California.

May
 May 14 – Team New Zealand wins the America's Cup in San Diego, beating Stars and Stripes 5–0.
 May 17 – Shawn Nelson, 35, goes on a tank rampage in San Diego.
 May 20 – U.S. President Bill Clinton indefinitely closes part of Pennsylvania Avenue in front of the White House to vehicular traffic in response to the Oklahoma City bombing.
 May 23 – Oklahoma City bombing: In Oklahoma City, Oklahoma, the remains of the Alfred P. Murrah Federal Building are imploded.
 May 27 – In Culpeper, Virginia, actor Christopher Reeve is paralyzed from the neck down after falling from his horse in a riding competition.

June
 June 2 – Mrkonjić Grad incident: A United States Air Force F-16 piloted by Captain Scott O'Grady is shot down over Bosnia and Herzegovina while patrolling the NATO no-fly zone. O'Grady is rescued by U.S. Marines six days later.
 June 6 – U.S. astronaut Norman Thagard breaks NASA's space endurance record of 14 days, 1 hour and 16 minutes, aboard the Russian space station Mir.
 June 15 – During his murder trial, O. J. Simpson puts on a pair of gloves that were presumably worn by the person who murdered his ex-wife and her friend Ron Goldman. Defense attorney Johnnie Cochran quips, "If it doesn't fit, you must acquit." The gloves appear too tight on Simpson's hands.
 June 16 – The International Olympic Committee awards the 2002 Winter Olympics to Salt Lake City, Utah.
 June 23 – Walt Disney Pictures' 33rd feature film, Pocahontas, is released, garnering a predominately mixed reception (the first Disney animated film to do so since 1988's Oliver & Company) but strong financial success.
 June 24 – The New Jersey Devils sweep the heavily favored Detroit Red Wings to win their first Stanley Cup in the lock-out shortened season.
 June 29 – STS-71: Space Shuttle Atlantis docks with the Russian Mir space station for the first time.

July

 July – Midwestern United States heat wave: An unprecedented heat wave strikes the Midwestern United States for most of the month. At least 739 people die in Chicago alone.
 July 5 – The U.S. Congress passes the Child Protection and Obscenity Enforcement Act, requiring that producers of pornography keep records of all models who are filmed or photographed, and that all models be at least 18 years of age.
 July 13 – Dozens of cities, most notably Chicago and Milwaukee, set all-time record high temperatures. Hundreds in these and other cities die as the Chicago Heat Wave of 1995 reaches its peak.
 July 23 – David Daliberti and William Barloon, two Americans held as spies by Iraq, are released by Saddam Hussein after negotiations with U.S. Congressman Bill Richardson.
 July 27 – In Washington, D.C., the Korean War Veterans Memorial is dedicated.
 July 28 – Two followers of Rajneesh are convicted for their part in the 1985 Rajneeshee assassination plot in Oregon.

August
 August 6 – Hundreds in Hiroshima, Nagasaki, Washington, D.C., and Tokyo mark the 50th anniversary of the dropping of the atomic bomb.
 August 24 – Microsoft releases Windows 95.

September

 September 6 – Cal Ripken Jr. of the Baltimore Orioles breaks the all time consecutive games played record in Major League Baseball.
 September 9 – Kids' WB debuts on The WB, anchored by Animaniacs, which transfers over from Fox's children's programming block, Fox Kids. It debuted on Fox Kids 2 years before.
 September 19 – The Washington Post and The New York Times publish the Unabomber manifesto several months after it is written.
 September 22 – American millionaire Steve Forbes announces his candidacy for the 1996 Republican presidential nomination.
 September 23 
 Argentine national Guillermo "Bill" Gaede is arrested in Phoenix, Arizona on charges of industrial espionage. His sales to Cuba, China, North Korea and Iran are believed to have involved Intel and AMD trade secrets worth US$10–20 million.
 Gordon B. Hinckley, president of the Church of Jesus Christ of Latter-day Saints, reads "The Family: A Proclamation to the World" in the church's semiannual all-women's meeting. The proclamation is a definitive document about the church's doctrine on the nature and importance of the family as "the basic unit of society" and continues to shape current LDS policy as well as interfaith cooperative efforts.

October

 October 1 – Ten people are convicted of the 1993 World Trade Center bombing.
 October 2 - The Seattle Mariners clinch their first postseason berth in franchise history defeating the California Angels, 9-1, in the 1995 AL West Tiebreaker.
 October 3 – O. J. Simpson is found not guilty of double murder for the deaths of former wife Nicole Brown Simpson and Ronald Goldman.
 October 4 – Hurricane Opal makes landfall at Pensacola Beach, Florida as a Category 3 hurricane with  winds.
 October 9 – 1995 Palo Verde derailment: An Amtrak Sunset Limited train is derailed by saboteurs near Palo Verde, Arizona.
 October 15 – The Carolina Panthers win their first-ever regular season game by defeating the New York Jets at Clemson Memorial Stadium in South Carolina.
 October 16 – The Million Man March is held in Washington, D.C. The event was conceived by Nation of Islam leader Louis Farrakhan.
 October 23 – Louis Jones Jr. is convicted of the kidnapping and murder of Tracie McBride, having abducted her at gunpoint from Goodfellow Air Force Base, Texas. The federal government sentences him to death for his crimes.
 October 25 – 1995 Fox River Grove bus–train collision: A Metra commuter train slams into a school bus in Fox River Grove, Illinois, killing seven students.
 October 28 – The Atlanta Braves defeat the Cleveland Indians, 4 games to 2, to win their first World Series Title in Atlanta.

November
 November 1 
 NASA loses contact with the Pioneer 11 probe.
 Participants in the Yugoslav War begin negotiations at Wright-Patterson Air Force Base in Dayton, Ohio.
 The U.S. House of Representatives passes the Partial-Birth Abortion Ban Act of 1995, outlawing intact dilation and extraction abortions. President Bill Clinton vetoes the bill in 1996.
 November 3 – At Arlington National Cemetery, U.S. President Bill Clinton dedicates a memorial to the victims of the Pan Am Flight 103 bombing.
 November 7 – The Landmark Hotel and Casino in Las Vegas is imploded to make room for a parking lot for the Las Vegas Convention Center.
 November 14–19 – Federal government shutdown: A budget standoff between Democrats and Republicans in Congress forces the federal government to temporarily close national parks and museums, and run most government offices with skeleton staff.
 November 21 – The Dow Jones Industrial Average gains 40.46 to close at 5,023.55, its first close above 5,000. This makes 1995 the first year where the Dow surpasses two millennium marks in a single year.
 November 21 – The Dayton Agreement to end the Bosnian War is reached at Wright-Patterson Air Force Base near Dayton, Ohio (signed December 14).
 November 22 – Six-year-old Elisa Izquierdo's child abuse-related death at the hands of her mother makes headlines, and instigates major reform in New York City's child welfare system.
 November 22 – The first ever full-length computer animated feature film, Toy Story, is released by Pixar and Walt Disney Pictures.
 November 28 – U.S. President Bill Clinton signs the National Highway System Designation Act of 1995, which ends the federal 55 mph speed limit.

December
 December 7 – NASA's Galileo probe reenters over Jupiter.
 December 13 – The Republic of Texas group claims to have formed a provisional government in Texas.
 December 15 – Because of the "quadruple-witching" option expiration, volume on the New York Stock Exchange hits 638 million shares, the highest single-day volume since October 20, 1987, when the Dow staged a stunning recovery a day after Black Monday.
 December 16 – The federal government has another shutdown as the budget disagreement continues. It re-opens on January 6, 1996.
 December 31 – The final original Calvin and Hobbes comic strip is published.

Ongoing
 Iraqi no-fly zones (1991–2003)
 Operation Uphold Democracy (1994–1995)
 Dot-com bubble (c. 1995–c. 2000)

Sport
July 1 – The Quebec Nordiques relocate from Quebec City, Quebec to Denver, Colorado to become the Colorado Avalanche.
November 19 – The Baltimore Stallions become the first (and only) American team to win a Grey Cup by defeating the Calgary Stampeders 37 to 20. Gainesville, Florida's Tracy Ham is awarded the game's Most Valuable Player.

Births

January 

 January 1 – Poppy, American singer
 January 4 – Maddie Hasson, actress
 January 5 
 Maggie Sajak, singer
 January 6 
 Will Butcher, hockey player
 McKenna Faith, singer-songwriter
 Joshua Farris, figure skater
 Zach Pfeffer, soccer player 
 January 7
 Jessica Darrow, singer and actress
 Leslie Grace, singer-songwriter
 January 8 – Ryan Destiny, actress, singer and songwriter
 January 9 – Nicola Peltz, actress
 January 11
J. P. Crawford, high school baseball player
Corey Davis, American football player
 January 13
 Natalia Dyer, actress 
 Qaasim Middleton, actor, musician and singer 
 Maria Elena Ubina, squash player
 January 17 – Indya Moore, actor
 January 18 
 Braheme Days Jr., track and field athlete
 Leonard Fournette, American football player
 Farida Osman, swimmer
 January 20 – Joey Badass, rapper
 January 21 – Jake Elliott, American football player
 January 22 – Davis Webb, American football player
 January 26 – Kyle Chavarria, actress
 January 30 
 Danielle Campbell, actress
 Thia Megia, singer

February 

 February 2 – Max Browne, football player
 February 5 
 Paul Arriola, soccer player
 Trayvon Martin (died 2012)
 February 10 – Lexi Thompson, golfer
 February 13 – Lia Neal, swimmer
 February 14 
 John Hayden, ice hockey player
 Ian Clarkin, baseball player
 February 15 – Megan Thee Stallion, American rapper 
 February 16
 Denzel Curry, rapper 
 Mizkif, YouTuber and Twitch streamer
 February 17 
 Jane Campbell, soccer player
 Madison Keys, tennis player
 February 18 – Samantha Crawford, tennis player
 February 21 – Giveon, singer
 February 22 – Trent Kowalik, actor, dancer and singer
 February 23 – Kyle O'Gara, racing driver
 February 28 
 Madisen Beaty, actress
 Quinn Shephard, actress

March 

 March 1 
 Jan Abaza, tennis player
 Jonathan Krohn, journalist and writer
 March 2
Reese McGuire, high school baseball player
Taywan Taylor, American football player
 March 5 
 Sage Karam, racing driver
 March 7 
 Nick Ciuffo, high school baseball player
 Hailey Clauson, model
 Michael McCarron, ice hockey player
 Haley Lu Richardson, actress
 Steven Santini, ice hockey defenceman
 tyler1, Twitch streamer
 March 9 
 BeeJay Anya, basketball player
 Cierra Ramirez, actress and singer
 March 10
 Grace Victoria Cox, actress
 Zach LaVine, basketball player 
 March 11 –  Sasha Alex Sloan, singer 
 March 13 – Mikaela Shiffrin, ski racer
 March 15 – Jabari Parker, high school basketball player
 March 16 – Beau Hossler, golfer 
 March 17 – Claressa Shields, boxer
 March 19 – Philip Daniel Bolden, actor
 March 20 – Keenan Cahill, actor
 March 21 – Diggy Simmons, rapper and son of Joseph Simmons
 March 22 – Nick Robinson, actor
 March 23 – Victoria Pedretti, actress
 March 25 – Logan Owen, cyclist
 March 27 – Taylor Atelian, actress
 March 28 – Rachel Farley, singer

April 

 April 1 – Logan Paul, Vine star and YouTuber
 April 8 – J. T. Compher, ice hockey player
 April 15 
 Kiri Baga, figure skater
 Cody Christian, actor
 April 17 – ZeRo, gamer
 April 18 – Virginia Gardner, actress
 April 19 – Arizona Zervas, musicians
 April 23 – Gigi Hadid, model
 April 24 – Kehlani, singer
 April 27 – Jonathan "Jazz" Russell, jazz violinist
 April 29 – Dylan Murray, squash player

May 

 May 1 – Artie Burns, American football player
 May 3
 Austin Meadows, baseball player
 Zach Sobiech, singer and viral video performer (d. 2013)
 May 4 – Shameik Moore, actor
 May 5 – Devon Gearhart, actor
 May 7 – Charlotte McKane, student
 May 9 
 Grant Austin Taylor, guitarist
 Kassidy Cook, diver
 May 10 – Missy Franklin, swimmer
 May 11 – Sachia Vickery, tennis player
 May 12 
 Luke Benward, actor and singer
 Kenton Duty, actor dancer and singer
 Sawyer Sweeten, actor (d. 2015)
 May 14 – Shameik Moore, actor, rapper, dancer, model, and singer
 May 16 – Marco Delgado, soccer player
 May 19 – Mary Beth Marley, pair skater
 May 23 
Tyus Bowser, American football player
 May 24 – Sabrina Vega, gymnast
 May 25
 Greg Grossman
 Gabby Soleil, actress
 May 28 – Jacob Kogan, actor
 May 31
 Alissa Musto, singer and pianist
 Tyla Yaweh, singer and rapper

June 
 June 2 – Sterling Beaumon, actor
 June 3
Dani Cameranesi, ice hockey player
Vernon Hargreaves, American football player
 June 5 – Troye Sivan, singer
 June 6 – Jack Kilmer, actor
 June 14 
 Alexandra Savior, singer
 Jaylon Smith, footballer outside linebacker
 Laquon Treadwell, footballer wide receiver
 June 15 – Dominic Smith, baseball player
 June 19 
 Vanessa Lam, figure skater
 Blake Woodruff, actor
 June 20 
 Gus Johnson (comedian), comedian and Internet personality
 Serayah, actress, model and singer
 June 21 – Jessica Ahlquist, student
 June 24 – Rex Lewis-Clack, pianist
 June 26 – Elizabeth Pipko, model
 June 30 – Allie Kiick, tennis player

July 

 July 1 – Savvy Shields, Miss America 2017
 July 2 – Ryan Murphy, swimmer 
 July 4 – Post Malone, musician 
 July 6
 Brooklee Han, figure skater
 Ludwig Ahgren, internet personality
 July 7
 Su'a Cravens, football player
 Mary Sarah, singer and songwriter
 July 10 – Phillip Bickford, high school baseball player
 July 11 – Blu Hunt, actress
 July 12 – Jordyn Wieber, gymnast
 July 13 – Lil Snupe, rap artist (died 2013)
 July 16 – Letticia Martinez, swimmer 
 July 20
 Shaquem Griffin, American football player
 Shaquill Griffin, American football player
 July 22 
 Ashley Cain, figure skater
 Ezekiel Elliott, American football player
 July 24
 Kellyn Acosta, soccer player
 Kyle Kuzma, American basketball player
 July 25 – Alvin Kamara, American football player
 July 29 – Jennifer Michelle Brown, actress, musician and singer-songwriter
 July 31 – Lil Uzi Vert, rapper

August 

 August 3 – Sarah Al Flaij, American-born Bahraini swimmer
 August 4 – Jessica Sanchez, singer 
 August 5 – Ian McCoshen, ice hockey defenceman
 August 7 – Fedmyster, Twitch streamer 
 August 9
 Eli Apple, American football player
 Justice Smith, actor
 August 10
 Stephon Clark, man who was killed by the Sacramento Police Department (died 2018)
 Dalvin Cook, American football player
 August 13 – Nicole Rajicova, figure skater
 August 15 – Chief Keef, rapper
 August 16 – James Young, basketball player 
 August 17 – Gracie Gold, figure skater
 August 18 – Parker McKenna Posey, actress
 August 19 – Patrick Clark Jr., pro wrestler
 August 20 – Liana Liberato, actress
 August 22 – Lulu Antariksa, actress and singer
 August 23 – Tommy Batchelor, dancer
 August 24 
 George Li, pianist
 Noah Vonleh, basketball player
 August 28 – Joshua Kalu, American football player

September 

 September 2 
 Kian Lawley, internet celebrity and actor
 Will Hernandez, American football guard
 September 5 – Caroline Sunshine, actress, dancer and singer
 September 8 – Thuliso Dingwall, actor 
 September 10 – Amando Moreno, soccer player
 September 12 – Ryan Potter, actor and martial artist
 September 14 – Deshaun Watson, American football player
 September 16 – Aaron Gordon, basketball player
 September 17
 Katherine Ip, tennis player
 Patrick Mahomes, football player
 September 20
 Sammi Hanratty, actress and singer
 September 22 
 Juliette Goglia, actress
 Dakari Johnson, high school basketball player
 September 25 – Ryan Beatty, singer
 September 27 – Daeg Faerch, actor

October 

 October 1 – Gillian Ryan, swimmer 
 October 3 – Michael Parsons, figure skater
 October 4 – Jabrill Peppers, footballer 
 October 8 – G Herbo, rapper
 October 16 – Fuego Del Sol, pro wrestler
 October 17
 Jamal Adams, American football player
 Queen Naija, singer and media personality
 October 15 – Billy Unger, actor
 October 21
 Doja Cat, musician
 Shannon Magrane, singer
 October 23
 Ireland Baldwin, model and daughter of Alec Baldwin and Kim Basinger 
 Shotaro Omori, figure skater
 October 28 – Haven Denney, figure skater
 October 30 – Andy Pessoa, actor
 October 31 – Marcel Everett, musician and producer

November 

 November – Da'Shawn Hand, footballer
 November 2 – Brandon Soo Hoo, actor
 November 3 – Kendall Jenner, actress, model and brand ambassador
 November 15 – Karl-Anthony Towns, basketball player
 November 16 
Noah Gray-Cabey, actor and pianist
Kirk Knight, rapper and record producer
 November 19 – Daniel Naroditsky, chess player
 November 22 – Katherine McNamara, actress
 November 25 – 42 Dugg, rapper
 November 27 – Kiara Nowlin, gymnast
 November 28 – Chase Elliott, stock car racer
 November 29 
 Ariel Hsing, table tennis player
 Laura Marano, actress and singer
 November 30 – Victoria Duval, tennis player

December 

 December 6 – A Boogie wit da Hoodie, rapper
 December 7 – Collin Altamirano, tennis player
 December 9 – McKayla Maroney, artistic gymnast
 December 14 – Jaylon Ferguson, American football player (died 2022)
December 15 
 Courtney Hicks, figure skater
 Jahlil Okafor, high school basketball player
 December 18 – Elizabeth Stanton, television host
 December 19 – Alpharad, esports personality
 December 26 – Zach Mills, actor
 December 27 – Timothée Chalamet, actor
 December 29
 Myles Garrett, American football player
 Ross Lynch, actor, dancer, instrumentalist and singer
 December 31 
 Gabby Douglas, artistic gymnast
 Axl Osborne, acrobatic gymnast

Full date unknown 
 Rochelle Ballantyne, chess player
 Sean Curley, actor
 Graeme Frost, notable victim
 Khalid Moultrie, actor

Deaths

January

 January 2 – Nancy Kelly, actress (born 1921)
 January 4 – Sol Tax, anthropologist (born 1907)
 January 7 – Murray Rothbard, American economist (b. 1926)
 January 11 – Josef Gingold, Russian-American violinist (b. 1909)
 January 22 – Rose Kennedy, American philanthropist (b. 1890)
 January 25
 John Smith, American actor (b. 1931)
 William Sylvester, American actor (b. 1922)
 January 31
 George Abbott, American writer, director, and producer (b. 1887)
 George Stibitz, American computational engineer (b. 1904)

February

 February 4 – Patricia Highsmith, American author (b. 1921)
 February 5 – Doug McClure, American actor (b. 1935)
 February 6 
 James Merrill, American poet (b. 1926)
 Art Taylor, American jazz drummer (b. 1929)
 February 9 
 J. William Fulbright, American senator and congressman (b. 1905)
 David Wayne, American actor (b. 1914)
 February 18 – Bob Stinson, rock guitarist (The Replacements and Static Taxi) (born 1959)
 February 14 – Michael V. Gazzo, American actor (b. 1923)
 February 19 – John Howard, American actor (b. 1913)
 February 22 – Ed Flanders, American actor (b. 1934)
 February 23 – Melvin Franklin, American singer (b. 1942)

March
 March 28 – Hugh O'Connor, actor son of Carroll O'Connor (born 1962)
 March 26 – Eazy E, American rapper and record producer (born 1964) 
 March 31 – Selena (Quintanilla Perez), singer-songwriter (born 1971)

April

 April 2 – Harvey Penick, golfer and coach (born 1904)
 April 4 – Priscilla Lane, American actress (b. 1915)
 April 14 – Burl Ives, American singer and actor (b. 1909)
 April 16 – Cy Endfield, American screenwriter (b. 1914)
 April 23 – Howard Cosell, American sportscaster (b. 1918)
 April 25 – Ginger Rogers, dancer and entertainer (born 1911)

May

 May 4
 Louis Krasner, Ukrainian-American violinist (b. 1903)
 Connie Wisniewski, baseball player (b. 1922)
 May 12 – Arthur Lubin, American film director (b. 1898)
 May 16 – Red Amick, American race car driver (b. 1929)  
 May 18
 Elisha Cook Jr., American actor (b. 1903)
 Alexander Godunov, Russian ballet dancer and actor (b. 1949)
 Elizabeth Montgomery, American actress (b. 1933)
 May 21 – Les Aspin, American politician (b. 1938)
 May 26 – Friz Freleng, American animator (b. 1906)
 May 29 – Margaret Chase Smith, American politician (b. 1897)

June
 June 14 – Roger Zelazny, fantasy and science fiction writer (born 1937)
 June 23 – Jonas Salk, medical researcher (born 1914)
 June 25 – Warren E. Burger, 15th Chief Justice of the U.S. (born 1907)
 June 29 – Lana Turner, actress (born 1921)

July
 July 1 – Wolfman Jack, disc jockey (born 1938)
 July 4 – Bob Ross, painter, art instructor, and television host (born 1942)

August
 August 3 – Ida Lupino, actress and director (born 1918 in the United Kingdom)
 August 9 – Jerry Garcia, rock guitarist (Grateful Dead) (born 1942)
 August 11 – Alonzo Church, mathematician (born 1903)
 August 13 – Mickey Mantle, baseball player (born 1931)

September
 September 19 – Orville Redenbacher, businessman (born 1907)
 September 29 – Madalyn Murray O'Hair, atheist activist (born 1919)

October
October 21 — Shannon Hoon, American singer songwriter and musician; lead singer of the band Blind Melon from 1990 until his death at the age of 28 in 1995 (born 1967)

November
 November 17 – Marguerite Young, novelist, poet and biographer (born 1908)
 November 22 – Margaret St. Clair, science fiction writer (born 1911)

December
 December 2 – Roxie Roker, actress (born 1929)
 December 9 – Vivian Blaine, actress and singer (born 1921)
 December 16 – Johnny Moss, poker player (born 1907)
 December 22 – Butterfly McQueen, actress (born 1911)
 December 25 – Dean Martin, singer and entertainer (born 1917)
 December 29 – Lita Grey, actress (born 1908)
 December 30 – Charles Smith, real estate developer (born 1901)

See also 
 1995 in American television
 List of American films of 1995
 Timeline of United States history (1990–2009)

References

External links
 

 
1990s in the United States
United States
United States
Years of the 20th century in the United States